Mátraverebély is a city in Nógrád county, Hungary.

Etymology
Slovak vrábeľ (sparrow) → verebély. See also Vráble.

References

See also 

Populated places in Nógrád County